Kort or KORT may refer to:

People
Given name
Kort Rogge (c. 1425-1501), also known as Rogge Kyle, Konrad Rogge, Cort Rogge, Conradus Roggo gothus and Conradus Roggo de Holmis, a Swedish bishop, member of the Privy Council of Sweden, and humanist
Kort Schubert (born 1979), American rugby union footballer

Surname: Kort
Dawid Kort (born 1995), Polish footballer 
Ellen Kort, American poet
Joe Kort (born 1963), American psychotherapist, clinical social worker, clinical sexologist, author, lecturer
Ludwig Kort, German fluid dynamicist known for developing the ducted propeller, or Kort nozzle
Michael Kort (born 1944), American historian, academic, and author who studies and has written extensively about the history of the Soviet Union
Milton Kort (1917–2003), American pharmacist, hobbyist magician

Surname: Korts
Berthold Korts (1912–1943), World War II Luftwaffe fighter ace

Surname: de Kort
Bram de Kort (born 1991), Dutch racing cyclist 
Gérard de Kort (born 1963), Dutch butterfly swimmer
Hein de Kort (born 1956), Dutch cartoonist
Kees de Kort (born 1934), Dutch artist best known for his illustrations of Bible scenes for children's books
Koen de Kort (born 1982), Dutch cyclist
Michael DeKort, American engineering project manager at Lockheed Martin, whistleblower

Media
 KORT (AM), a radio station (1230 AM) licensed to Grangeville, Idaho, U.S.
 KORT-FM, a radio station (92.7 FM) licensed to Grangeville, Idaho, U.S.

Others
Franska Kort, 1976 album of Swedish singer/songwriter Ted Gärdestad
Kort Grocery, also known as Camp Springs Grocery, a historic property located on Four Mile Road in Camp Springs, Kentucky, a rural area of Campbell County, Kentucky
 Kort nozzle or ducted propeller, an assembly for marine propulsion
Kört-Aika Monument, a steel statue located at the entrance to the village of Kortkeros, Kortkerossky District, Komi Republic, Russia
T:kort, a digital ticket used for travel with public transport in Trøndelag, Norway
Kort, an Indonesian music magazine

See also
 Körting
 Korte (disambiguation)
 Cort (disambiguation)